Lindsay Jaylyn Price Stone (born December 6, 1976) is an American television actress and singer. She is best known for her roles as Janet Sosna on Beverly Hills, 90210 and as Victory Ford on Lipstick Jungle. She is also known for her work on soap operas such as All My Children and The Bold and the Beautiful.

Early life
Price was born in Arcadia, California, to William Price, an American of German and Irish descent, and Haeja Diane Price, who was born in Korea. Price's parents were raised together as siblings, as the family adopted the orphaned Haeja from Korea after the Korean War. Haeja and her biological brother were both abandoned by their mother, who remarried after their father was killed in the war.

Career
In 1982, she appeared in a television commercial for toy retailer Toys "R" Us with fellow child star Jaleel White. She has also appeared in television commercials for Wanda, McDonald's, Vivitar and Island Fun Barbie. She has appeared in magazine covers for Canada's Avenue and US' Steppin' Out, Fitness, Hamptons, Audrey and Yellow.

Her first on-screen appearance was a role as Lan in the episode "Yesterday's Child" of ABC's drama television series Finder of Lost Loves. In 1989, she appeared in an episode of television series The Wonder Years titled "Walk Out" and an episode of the game show I'm Telling! with her older brother, Bryan. They only missed one question on I'm Telling! and amassed the second highest score in the show's history. She appeared as An Li Chen on the daytime soap opera All My Children and as Michael Lai on The Bold and the Beautiful.

She joined the cast of Beverly Hills, 90210 in January 1998 as Janet Sosna, a graphic designer at the Beverly Beat newspaper. She remained on the show through its finale in May 2000, appearing in a total of 73 episodes. She then reprised the role as Michael Lai on The Bold and the Beautiful from June to August 2000, April to August 2005, and November 2009. Price had a recurring role on Becker, where she played Amanda, Jake Malinak (Alex Désert)'s girlfriend, a role that spanned three seasons.

In 2006, she co-starred on The WB television show Pepper Dennis, opposite Rebecca Romijn, in the role of Kimmy Kim. She appeared in the short-lived American remake of the British series, Coupling, in addition to singing the show's theme song, a cover of "Perhaps, Perhaps, Perhaps". She guest starred in NCIS for two episodes as a neurotic fling of main character, Anthony DiNozzo.

From 2008 to 2009, she starred in the NBC drama Lipstick Jungle as Victory Ford, an up-and-coming fashion designer in New York City. She guest-starred in an episode of How I Met Your Mother and played Joanna Frankel in ABC's Eastwick, where she once again starred opposite Rebecca Romijn.

Price has also had a career in music. Price wrote and performed on a five-song EP entitled Someone Like Me, which was released in 2007.

Personal life
Price married television producer and director Shawn Piller in July 2004 at a ranch in Malibu. The couple divorced in 2007.

Price began dating Australian celebrity chef Curtis Stone in late 2009. Their son, Hudson, was born November 6, 2011.  Price and Stone became engaged in July 2012, and married on June 8, 2013, in Spain. Their second son, Emerson Spencer, was born September 16, 2014.

Filmography

Film

Television

References

External links 
 

1976 births
20th-century American actresses
21st-century American actresses
Actresses from California
American child actresses
American film actresses
American people of German descent
American people of Irish descent
American actresses of Korean descent
American expatriates in Australia
American pop rock singers
American soap opera actresses
American television actresses
American video game actresses
Living people
People from Arcadia, California
21st-century American women singers
21st-century American singers